Captain Robert Laurence Nairac  (31 August 1948 – 15 May 1977) was a British Army officer in the Grenadier Guards who was abducted from a pub in Dromintee, south County Armagh, during an undercover operation and killed by the Provisional Irish Republican Army (IRA) on his fourth tour of duty in Northern Ireland as a Military Intelligence Liaison Officer.

Several men have been imprisoned for his death. His body has never been found.

Early life
Nairac was born in Mauritius, then a British Crown colony, to an English mother and a father of French Mauritian origin. His mother, Barbara (née Dykes) was Anglican and his father, Maurice, a Catholic who worked as an eye surgeon. Nairac was the youngest of four children; he had two sisters and a brother. His brother David died of myocarditis in 1962, aged 24.

He attended preparatory school at Gilling Castle, a feeder school for Ampleforth College, a Catholic public school, which he attended a year later. Whilst at Ampleforth he academically excelled, was head of his house and played rugby for the school. He became friends with the sons of Lord Killanin and went to stay with the family in Dublin and in Spiddal in Connemara, County Galway.

Nairac read medieval and military history at Lincoln College, Oxford, where he excelled in sport; he played for the Oxford University Rugby 2nd XV and revived the Oxford University boxing club, with which he won four blues in bouts with Cambridge. He was also a falconer, keeping in his rooms a bird that was used in the film Kes.

He left Oxford in 1971 and entered the Royal Military Academy Sandhurst under the sponsorship of the Grenadier Guards, into which he was commissioned on graduation. After Sandhurst, he undertook postgraduate studies at the University of Dublin, before joining the regiment.

Military service in Northern Ireland
Nairac's first tour of duty in Northern Ireland was with No.1 Company, the Second Battalion of the Grenadier Guards. The Battalion was stationed in Belfast from 5 July 1973 to 31 October 1973. The Grenadiers were given responsibility first for the Protestant Shankill Road area and the predominantly Catholic Ardoyne area. This was a time of high tension and regular contact with paramilitaries. Ostensibly, the battalion's main objectives were to search for weapons and to find paramilitaries. Nairac was frequently involved in such activity on the streets of Belfast and was a community relations activist at the Ardoyne sports club. The battalion's tour was adjudged a success with 58 weapons, 9,000 rounds of ammunition and 693 lbs of explosives taken and 104 men jailed. The battalion had no casualties and did not shoot anyone. After his tour had ended he stayed on as liaison officer for the replacement battalion, the 1st Battalion of the Argyll and Sutherland Highlanders. On their first patrol, Nairac narrowly avoided the impact of the explosion of a car bomb on the Crumlin Road.

Rather than returning to his battalion, which was being transferred to Hong Kong, Nairac volunteered for military intelligence duties in Northern Ireland. Following the completion of several training courses, he returned to Northern Ireland in 1974, attached to 4 Field Survey Troop, Royal Engineers, one of the three subunits of a Special Duties unit known as 14 Intelligence Company (14 Int). Posted to South County Armagh, 4 Field Survey Troop was given the task of performing surveillance duties. Nairac was the liaison officer for the unit, the local British Army brigade and the Royal Ulster Constabulary (RUC).

He assumed duties outside his official jurisdiction as a liaison officer, including undercover operations. He apparently claimed to have visited pubs in Irish republican strongholds, sung Irish rebel songs and acquired the nickname "Danny Boy". He was driven to pubs by the future Conservative MP Patrick Mercer, who was then an army officer. Former Special Air Service (SAS) Warrant Officer Ken Connor, who was involved in the creation of 14 Int, wrote of him in his book, Ghost Force, p. 263:

Nairac finished his tour with 14th Int in mid-1975 and returned to his regiment in London, having been promoted to Captain on 4 September 1975. Following a rise in violence culminating in the Kingsmill massacre, the British Army increased their presence in Northern Ireland, and Nairac accepted a post as a liaison officer. On his fourth tour, Nairac was a liaison officer in Bessbrook Mill.

Death
On the evening of 14 May 1977, Nairac drove alone to The Three Steps pub in Dromintee, a village in south County Armagh. He is said to have told regulars of the pub that he was Danny McErlaine, a motor mechanic and member of the Official IRA from the Irish Republican Ardoyne area in North Belfast. The real McErlaine, on the run since 1974, was ultimately killed by the Provisional IRA in June 1978 after stealing arms from the organisation. Witnesses say that Nairac got up and sang a republican folk song, "The Broad Black Brimmer", with the band who were playing that night. At around 11.45 p.m., he was abducted, following a struggle in the pub's car park and taken across the border into the Republic of Ireland to a field in the Ravensdale Woods in the north of County Louth. Following a violent interrogation, during which Nairac was allegedly punched, kicked, pistol-whipped and hit with a wooden post, he was shot dead in a field. He did not admit to his true identity. Terry McCormick, one of Nairac's abductors, posed as a priest in order to try to elicit information by way of Nairac's confession. Nairac's last words according to McCormick were: "Bless me, Father, for I have sinned". Claims that his body was disposed of by being put through a meat grinder have been dismissed as a myth.

His disappearance sparked a large-scale search throughout Ireland. The hunt in Northern Ireland was led by Major H. Jones,  Brigade Major at HQ 3rd Infantry Brigade. Nairac and Jones had become friends and Nairac would sometimes eat supper at the Jones household. After a four-day search, the Garda Síochána confirmed to the RUC that they had reliable evidence of Nairac's killing.

An edition of Spotlight, broadcast on 19 June 2007, claimed that his body was not destroyed in a meat grinder, as alleged by an unnamed IRA source. McCormick, who has been on the run in the United States for thirty years because of his involvement in the killing (including being the first to attack Nairac in the car park), was told by a senior IRA commander that he was buried on farmland and reburied elsewhere. The location of the body's resting place remains a mystery. Nairac is one of three IRA victims whose graves have never been revealed and who are among those known as 'The Disappeared'. The cases are under review by the Independent Commission for the Location of Victims' Remains.

In May 2000, allegations were made claiming that Nairac had married and fathered a child with a woman named Nel Lister, also known as Oonagh Flynn or Oonagh Lister. In 2001, her son sought DNA testing and revealed the allegations to be untrue.

Criminal prosecutions
In November 1977, Liam Townson, a 24-year-old IRA member from the village of Meigh outside Newry, was convicted of Nairac's murder. Townson was the son of an Englishman who had married a County Meath woman. He confessed to killing Nairac and implicated other members of the unit involved. Townson made two admissible confessions to Garda officers. The first was made around the time of his arrest, it started with "I shot the British captain. He never told us anything. He was a great soldier." The second statement was made at Dundalk police station, after Townson had consulted a solicitor. He had become hysterical and distressed and screamed a confession to the officer in charge of the investigation.

Townson was convicted in Dublin's Special Criminal Court of Nairac's murder and sentenced to life imprisonment. He served 13 years before his 1990 release. In 1998, he was part of Conor Murphy's election campaign team.

In 1978, the RUC arrested five men from the South Armagh area. Three – Gerard Fearon, 21, Thomas Morgan, 18 and Daniel O'Rourke, 33 – were charged with Nairac's murder. Michael McCoy, 20, was charged with kidnapping and Owen Rocks, 22, was accused of withholding information. Fearon and Morgan were convicted of Nairac's murder. O'Rourke was acquitted, but found guilty of manslaughter and jailed for ten years. McCoy was jailed for five years and Rocks for two. Morgan died in a road accident in 1987, a year after his release. O'Rourke became a prominent Sinn Féin member in Drumintee.

Two other men, Terry McCormick and Pat Maguire, wanted in connection with this incident, remain on the run. Maguire has been reported as living in New Jersey in the US.

On 20 May 2008, 57-year-old IRA veteran Kevin Crilly of Jonesborough, County Armagh was arrested by officers of the Police Service of Northern Ireland (PSNI). He had been on the run in the United States but had returned to Northern Ireland under an alias. He was charged the following day with the kidnapping and false imprisonment of Nairac. In November 2009, Crilly was also charged with the murder of Nairac at Newry magistrates' court during a bail hearing on the two counts on which he had been charged in 2008. Crilly was cleared on all counts in April 2011, as the judge considered that the prosecution had failed to prove intention or prior knowledge on his part.

Nairac's killing is one of those under investigation by the PSNI's Historical Enquiries Team (HET).

George Cross Award
On 13 February 1979, Nairac was posthumously awarded the George Cross.

Collusion allegations
Posthumous claims have been made about Nairac's involvement in the Dublin and Monaghan Bombings, the killing of an IRA member in the Republic of Ireland and his relationship with Ulster loyalist paramilitaries.

Hidden Hand documentary
Nairac has been accused of involvement in the murder of an IRA member and of collusion with loyalist paramilitaries.

Allegations were made concerning Nairac in a 1993 Yorkshire Television documentary about the Dublin and Monaghan Bombings of May 1974 entitled Hidden Hand. The narrator states:

According to the documentary, support for this allegation was said to have come from various sources:

Geoff Knupfer of the Independent Commission for the Location of Victims' Remains stated that Nairac was in Ashford, Kent, England at the time of the bombings.

Holroyd
Secret Intelligence Service operative, Captain Fred Holroyd, said Nairac admitted involvement in the assassination of IRA member John Francis Green on 10 January 1975 to him. Holroyd claimed in a New Statesman article written by Duncan Campbell that Nairac had boasted about Green's death and showed him a colour Polaroid photograph of Green's corpse taken directly after his assassination.

These claims were given prominence when, in 1987, Ken Livingstone MP told the House of Commons that Nairac was quite likely to have been the person who organised the Miami Showband killings.

The Barron Report stated that:

Holroyd's evidence was also questioned by Barron in the following terms: 

Barron Report
Nairac was mentioned in Mr. Justice Henry Barron's inquiry into the Dublin and Monaghan bombings when it examined the claims made by the Hidden Hand documentary, Holroyd and Colin Wallace

Former RUC Special Patrol Group member John Weir, who was also a UVF member, claimed he had received information from an informant that Nairac was involved in the killing of Green:

In addition, "Surviving Miami Showband members Steve Travers and Des McAlee testified in court that an Army officer with a crisp English accent oversaw the Miami attack", the implication being that this was Nairac. Travers was uncertain whether or not Nairac was the man overseeing the attack, stating that his distinct impression was that the man had fair hair, in contrast to Nairac's dark hair.

Fred Holroyd and John Weir also linked Nairac to the Green and Miami Showband killings. Martin Dillon, however, in his book The Dirty War, maintained that Nairac was not involved in either attack. Geoff Knupfer of the Independent Commission for the Location of Victims' Remains states Nairac was in either London or Scotland at this time.

Colin Wallace, in describing Nairac as a Military Intelligence Liaison Officer said "his duties did not involve agent handling". Nevertheless, Nairac "seems to have had close links with the Mid-Ulster UVF, including Robin Jackson and Harris Boyle". According to Wallace, "he could not have carried out this open association without official approval, because otherwise he would have been transferred immediately from Northern Ireland". Wallace wrote in 1975; Nairac was on his fourth tour of duty in 1977.

Robin Jackson was implicated in the Dublin and Monaghan bombings of May 1974, and Harris Boyle was blown up by his own bomb during the Miami Showband massacre.

The Barron Inquiry found a chain of ballistic history linking weapons and killings under the control of a group of UVF and security force members, including RUC Special Patrol Group members John Weir and Billy McCaughey, that is connected to those alleged to have carried out the bombings. This group was known as the "Glenanne gang". Incidents they were responsible for "included, in 1975, three murders at Donnelly's bar in Silverbridge, the murders of two men at a fake Ulster Defence Regiment checkpoint, the murder of IRA man John Francis Green in the Republic, the murders of members of the Miami showband and the murder of Dorothy Trainor in Portadown in 1976, they included the murders of three members of the Reavey family, and the attack on the Rock Bar in Tassagh." According to Weir, members of the gang began to suspect that Nairac was playing republican and loyalist paramilitaries off against each other, by feeding them information about murders carried out by the "other side" with the intention of "provoking revenge attacks".

In fiction
Eoin McNamee's 2004 novel The Ultras contains a fictionalized, but factually-based account of Nairac's life. McNamee has said that he had had "the idea of Nairac in my head for a long time, but I wasn't able to find a way into the whole subject. In the end, I used him as a conduit to the covert and psychic infrastructure of the time, to the gripping physical and moral texture of what was going on."

See also
British Military Intelligence Systems in Northern Ireland
Columba McVeigh
Disappearance of Peter Wilson
The Troubles in Forkhill
Special Reconnaissance Unit
Peter Wilson (Disappeared)
Gerard Evans
List of kidnappings
List of solved missing person cases
Murder of Jean McConville
Murder of Gareth O'Connor
Internal Security Unit

Further reading
 Bradley, Anthony. Requiem for a Spy: The Killing of Robert Nairac. Cork: Mercier Pres, 1993. 
 Kerr, Alistair. Betrayal: The Murder of Robert Nairac GC. Cambridge Academic, 2017.

References

External links
 
The killing of Frank Green
Captain Fred Holroyd
Sunday Mirror article on Nairac's death 7 May 2000
2003 Interim Barron Report into the Dublin & Monaghan Bombings
Shadow Man investigative article by Eamonn O'Neill in Esquire magazine

1948 births
1970s missing person cases
1977 crimes in the Republic of Ireland
1977 deaths
Alumni of Lincoln College, Oxford
Alumni of Trinity College Dublin
Assassinated military personnel
British manslaughter victims
British military personnel killed in The Troubles (Northern Ireland)
British military personnel of The Troubles (Northern Ireland)
British recipients of the George Cross
Deaths by firearm in the Republic of Ireland
English people of French descent
English people of Mauritian descent
English Roman Catholics
Enforced disappearances in Northern Ireland
Graduates of the Royal Military Academy Sandhurst
Grenadier Guards officers
History of County Louth
Intelligence Corps officers
Kidnapped British people
Male murder victims
Military history of County Armagh
Missing person cases in Ireland
Murder convictions without a body
People educated at Ampleforth College
People killed by the Provisional Irish Republican Army
People murdered in the Republic of Ireland
Torture victims from Northern Ireland